Casa Belvedere is a cultural center devoted to Italian studies, located at 79 Howard Avenue, Grymes Hill, Staten Island, New York City.  The mansion was constructed in 1908, and is an Italian Renaissance style building with Arts and Crafts detailing.  It is a -story, stuccoed masonry structure with a -story service wing and attached conservatory.  It features an overhanging clay tile hipped roof with bracketed eaves and a portico with Ionic order columns and Doric order corner piers.  Also on the property is a contributing former garage.

Over the years it housed a number of different families, including for several years being the official residence of the President of Wagner College.  It was declared a New York City Landmark in 2006 and listed on the National Register of Historic Places in 2010 as the Louis A. and Laura Stirn House.  In 2008 it was purchased by Gina Biancardi and Luciano Rammairone, and turned into a cultural center.  In this role it hosts Italian language classes for both adults and children, wine tastings, lectures, films, cooking lessons, book signings, displays of Italian-made motor vehicles (e.g. Alfa Romeo, Lamborghini, and Vespa), and art exhibits, all with an Italian orientation.

Sources

Staten Island Advance, September 19, 2010, pages 1 and 6, with photos.

External links
 The Italian Foundation at Casa Belvedere

Houses on the National Register of Historic Places in Staten Island
Renaissance Revival architecture in New York City
Houses completed in 1908
Museums established in 2008
Italian-American culture in New York City
Italian-American museums
Museums in Staten Island
2008 establishments in New York City
New York City Designated Landmarks in Staten Island
Grymes Hill, Staten Island